Roffey F.C. is an English football club located in Roffey, Horsham in West Sussex.

History 
Roffey was formed in 1901 and had been playing in the Mid-Sussex Football Leagues, in recent times they had three consecutive league wins between 2008 and 2010 by going from Division Three to Division One. In 2011 the club applied and were accepted to play in the Sussex County Football League for the 2011–12 season.

in the 2018–19 season the club came third in the table and secured promotion into Division One of the Southern Combination Football League, for the first time in their history they entered senior level football from the intermediate level. Roffey became Division One league champions in the 2021–22 season securing promotion into the Southern Combination League Premier Division for the first time.

Stadium 
Roffey play their home games at Bartholomew Way, Roffey, Horsham, West Sussex.

Honors

League honors
Southern Combination Football League:
 Division One Winners (1): 2021–22
 Division Two Runners Up (1): 2015–16

Mid-Sussex Football League:
 Division One Winners (1): 2009–10
 Division Two Winners (1): 2008–09
 Division Three Winners (1): 2007–08

Cup honors
Southern Combination League Division Two Cup
 Winners (1): 2013–14

Sussex Intermediate Cup
 Runners up (1): 2016–17

Mid-Sussex Football League Senior Charity Cup:
 Winners (1): 2014–15

References

External links 
 
 

Football clubs in West Sussex
Horsham
Horsham District
Football clubs in England
1901 establishments in England
Association football clubs established in 1901